Howard Brown may refer to:

Howard Brown (Halifax Bank) (born 1966), British employee of Halifax Bank who became famous for appearing in their commercials
Howard Brown (pianist) (1920–2001), Canadian pianist
Howard Clifton Brown (1868–1946), British politician
Howard J. Brown (businessman) (c. 1923–2011), American United Communications Corporation owner
Howard Junior Brown (1924–1975), American gay rights activist
Howard Brown Health Center in Chicago, named for Howard Junior Brown
Howard Mayer Brown (1930–1993), American musicologist
Howard Elis Brown, merchant and politician from Ontario, Canada

See also
Howie Brown (1922–1975), guard in the National Football League